Mark Raper SJ AM is a Jesuit priest. He currently serves as president of the Jesuit Conference of Asia Pacific (formerly known as the Jesuit Conference of East Asia and Oceania), based in Manila.
He was previously provincial superior of the Society of Jesus in Oceania from 2002 until 2008.

From 1982 he was the first director for the Asia-Pacific arm of the Jesuit Refugee Service. He went on to become global director of JRS.

In 2001 he held a visiting chair in the School of Foreign Service at Georgetown University, Washington DC and was named a member in the General Division of the Order of Australia for his service to refugees.

He received the 2004 Australian Council For International Development Human Rights Award for his work in East Timor, Indonesia, Bosnia, Burma and Thailand.

He attended St Ignatius' College, Riverview.

See also

References

1956, Karl Rahner, and all that follows, Encounter, ABC Radio National, 24 September 2006

Living people
Members of the Order of Australia
Walsh School of Foreign Service faculty
Australian Jesuits
People educated at Saint Ignatius' College, Riverview
Year of birth missing (living people)